A mechanical system is rheonomous if its equations of constraints contain the time as an explicit variable.  Such constraints are called rheonomic constraints. The opposite of rheonomous is scleronomous.

Example: simple 2D pendulum

As shown at right, a simple pendulum is a system composed of a weight and a string. The string is attached at the top end to a pivot and at the bottom end to a weight. Being inextensible, the string has a constant length. Therefore, this system is scleronomous; it obeys the scleronomic constraint
 ,
where  is the position of the weight and  the length of the string.

The situation changes if the pivot point is moving, e.g. undergoing a simple harmonic motion
,
where  is the amplitude,  the angular frequency, and  time.

Although the top end of the string is not fixed, the length of this inextensible string is still a constant. The distance between the top end and the weight must stay the same. Therefore, this system is rheonomous; it obeys the rheonomic constraint
.

See also
Lagrangian mechanics
Holonomic constraints

References

Mechanics
Classical mechanics
Lagrangian mechanics